Athra Puttar is a 1981 Pakistani Punjabi language action comedy musical film, directed by Altaf Hussain and produced by Chaudhry Mohammad Arif. The film stars Sultan Rahi, Mustafa Qureshi, Aasia, Ali Ejaz, Nanha and Bazigha.

Cast
Sultan Rahi as Jamau
Mustafa Qureshi as Sooraj
Asiya as Lachhi
Ali Ejaz
Bazigha
Ajmal Khan
Nanha
Rangeela
Khalid Saleem Mota
Shahida
Sheikh Iqbal
Ilyas Kashmiri
Sawan
Azhar Khan
Cham Cham

Crew
Writer - Hazin Qadri
Producer - Chaudhry Mohammad Arif
Production Company - Ismail Productions
Cinematographer - Parvez Khan
Music Director - Wajahat Attre
Lyricist - Hazin Qadri
Playback Singers - Noor Jehan, Naheed Akhtar, Inayat Hussain Bhatti, Masood Rana, Shaukat Ali, Albela

Soundtrack

References

External links
 

Pakistani action comedy films
Punjabi-language Pakistani films
1981 films
1980s Punjabi-language films